Alfred Michaud (born November 6, 1976) is a Canadian former professional ice hockey goaltender. An Ojibwe, Michaud played junior seasons in the SJHL, and then began a three-year tenure with the Maine Black Bears, winning an NCAA Men's Ice Hockey Championship during his college career. Michaud turned professional with the Vancouver Canucks' American Hockey League (AHL) affiliate, the Syracuse Crunch in 1999. He played 2 games for the Canucks in 1999. He finished his professional career playing in the top Danish ice hockey league Superisligaen. He is currently the assistant coach for his alma mater Black Bears, and runs a goalie school, Dream Catcher's Hockey.

Career 
Never drafted into the NHL, Michaud signed a pro contract with the Vancouver Canucks in 1999 following success at the University of Maine in which he posted a 28–6–3 record with a 2.32 GAA. He would appear in 38 games in his first professional season for the Syracuse Crunch, Vancouver's AHL affiliate, and received a two-game call-up to the Canucks during an injury crunch, making his NHL debut on October 28 against the Phoenix Coyotes. His second and last NHL game was on November 7 against the St. Louis Blues. Over the course of the next two seasons, he continued to play in minor pro, but did not receive another chance at the NHL level.

Michaud was released by the Canucks in 2002, and had stints in the ECHL with the Reading Royals, Peoria Rivermen and Utah Grizzlies. He ended his career overseas with the Fischtown Pinguins in Germany and finally with SønderjyskE in Denmark.

During the 2010–11 season in Denmark he set a shutout record by going 360:58 without allowing a goal; the previous record in Denmark was 242 minutes.

Career statistics

Regular season and playoffs

Awards and honors

References

External links
 

1976 births
Living people
SønderjyskE Ishockey players
Sportspeople from Selkirk, Manitoba
Fischtown Pinguins players
Kansas City Blades players
Manitoba Moose players
Nürnberg Ice Tigers players
Ojibwe people
Peoria Rivermen (ECHL) players
Reading Royals players
Syracuse Crunch players
Tappara players
Undrafted National Hockey League players
Utah Grizzlies (ECHL) players
Vancouver Canucks players
Worcester IceCats players
Ice hockey people from Manitoba
Maine Black Bears men's ice hockey players
First Nations sportspeople
Canadian ice hockey goaltenders
NCAA men's ice hockey national champions